Senapala Samarasekera (10 February 1919 - 2 October 1984) was a Sri Lankan politician.

In the 1940s Samarasekera took over the responsibility of the family's tea plantation, the Kunduppakanda estate, in the Ruhuna tea production area in southern Sri Lanka near Galle in Angulugaha.

At the 4th parliamentary elections in March 1960 he was elected as the member for Akmeemana, representing the Lanka Prajathanthravadi Pakshaya (Ceylon Democratic Party), securing approximately 48% of the vote. At the subsequent parliamentary elections in July 1960 he retained the seat with an increased majority. During the parliamentary debate on the takeover of denominational schools towards the end of 1960 Samarasekera switched to the Sri Lanka Freedom Party.

Samarasekera was defeated at the 6th parliamentary elections in 1965 by a narrow margin of just over 1,000 votes. He was however successful in regaining the seat at the next parliamentary elections in 1970, with almost 60% of the vote. In July 1970 he was appointed Deputy Chairman of Committees a position he retained until July 1976.

References 

1919 births
Members of the 4th Parliament of Ceylon
Members of the 5th Parliament of Ceylon
Deputy chairmen of committees of the Parliament of Sri Lanka
Members of the 7th Parliament of Ceylon
People from Northern Province, Sri Lanka
People from British Ceylon
Sri Lanka Freedom Party politicians
1984 deaths